Tom Murphy is a professional Australian rules footballer playing for North Melbourne in the Australian Football League (AFL). He is a defender. Murphy made his debut in round 12, 2018, against the Brisbane Lions at Docklands Stadium, as a late replacement for Jarrad Waite.

Murphy originally played for the Dandenong Stingrays in the TAC Cup. He trained with North Melbourne's Victorian Football League squad before he was drafted by North Melbourne with pick 4 in the 2017 rookie draft. Recruiting manager Mark Finnigan said that Murphy was selected for his penetrating kick and mix of speed and endurance.

References

External links 
 
 
 

Living people
1998 births
North Melbourne Football Club players
Dandenong Stingrays players
Australian rules footballers from Victoria (Australia)